Xingping railway station is a station on Longhai railway in Xingping, Xianyang, Shaanxi.

History
The station was opened in 1936.

References

Railway stations in Shaanxi
Stations on the Longhai Railway
Railway stations in China opened in 1936